Zamanabad may refer to:

Chaharmahal and Bakhtiari Province
 Zamanabad, Chaharmahal and Bakhtiari, a village in Kuhrang County

East Azerbaijan Province
 Zamanabad, East Azerbaijan, a village in Malekan County

Hamadan Province
 Zamanabad, Malayer, a village in Malayer County
 Zamanabad-e Mohammadabad, a village in Malayer County
 Zamanabad, Nahavand, a village in Nahavand County

Isfahan Province
 Zamanabad, Isfahan, a village in Isfahan County
 Zamanabad, Lenjan, a village in Lenjan County
 Zamanabad, Nain, a village in Nain County

Kerman Province
 Zamanabad, Baft, a village in Baft County
 Zamanabad, Fahraj, a village in Fahraj County
 Zamanabad, Kerman, a village in Kerman County

Kermanshah Province
 Zamanabad, Kermanshah, a village in Kermanshah County

Khuzestan Province
 Zamanabad, Khuzestan, a village in Masjed Soleyman County

Markazi Province
 Zamanabad, Saveh, a village in Saveh County

North Khorasan Province
 Zamanabad, North Khorasan

Razavi Khorasan Province
 Zamanabad, Bardaskan, a village in Bardaskan County
 Zamanabad, Mashhad, a village in Mashhad County
 Zamanabad, Torbat-e Heydarieh, a village in Torbat-e Heydarieh County

Semnan Province
 Zamanabad, Semnan

Sistan and Baluchestan Province

South Khorasan Province
 Zamanabad, South Khorasan

Tehran Province
 Zamanabad, Tehran

West Azerbaijan Province
 Zamanabad, West Azerbaijan, a village in Shahin Dezh County

Yazd Province